Guzmania obtusiloba is a plant species in the genus Guzmania. This species is native to Costa Rica, Panama, and Colombia.

References

obtusiloba
Flora of Costa Rica
Flora of Panama
Flora of Colombia
Plants described in 1889